Graphelmis ceylonica is a species of riffle beetle found in Sri Lanka.

Description
This elongate, yellowish beetle has a typical length of about 2.29 to 2.60 mm in the male and about 2.41 to 2.65 mm in the female.

References 

Elmidae
Insects of Sri Lanka
Insects described in 1860